John Degerberg (27 March 1892 – 29 July 1972) was a Swedish stage and film actor.

Selected filmography
 South of the Highway (1936)
 Julia jubilerar (1938)
 Kalle's Inn (1939)
 Pimpernel Svensson (1950)

References

Bibliography 
 Qvist, Per Olov & von Bagh, Peter. Guide to the Cinema of Sweden and Finland. Greenwood Publishing Group, 2000.

External links 
 

1892 births
1972 deaths
Swedish male film actors
Swedish male stage actors
20th-century Swedish male actors
People from Lund